The Shiraz Metro (Metro-yé Shiraz) is the rapid transit system in Shiraz, Fars, Iran, operated by Shiraz Urban Railway Organization. Construction began in 2001, and service in the first line officially commenced on 11 October 2014.

Lines 
The Shiraz Metro consists of 6 lines. , Line 1 and 2 are operating, Line 3 is under construction, and the remaining 3 lines are at different stages of design and planning.

Line 1

Constructions for Line 1 were started in 2001, and the first phase for this line was officially commenced by Vice-president Eshaq Jahangiri on October 11, 2014. The first phase runs for 11 kilometres between Ehsan Sq. in the north-western part of the city and Namazi Sq. in downtown with eight stations in between. Line 1 runs over the ground surface between Mirza-yé Shirazi and Shahed stations. The second phase was recently commenced and service in now operational all the way to the Gol-é-Sorkh Sq., located just by the city airport in the south-eastern part of the city. This has extended Line 1 to 24.5 kilometres with 19 underground and 1 surface stations in between.

Stations in shallow underground sections have side platforms, while deep-level stations have island platforms.
Stations

Line 2

The  Line 2 officially opened on February 8, 2023, with 3 stations as the first phase. It intersects with Line 1 at Imam Hossein Sq.

Line 2 runs to Mian Rood and Aadel Abad via Enghelab Street and Basij Square. There are two separate tunnels, each with 7 metre in diameter, at the depth of 15 metres. Among the 13 planned stations, 2 of them will be on the surface.

Line 3 (to Sadra)
The seven-station,  Line 3 is under construction. First station will start from Mirza-ye Shirazi Metro Station in Line 1 and connects to Sadra, Fars, new city in northwest of Shiraz.

Future Lines

Lines 4, 5 and 6 are in the design stage.

Rolling stock
Line 1 is being operated using a fleet of 27 five-car 1.5 kV DC overhead electric train-sets which were supplied by the Chinese CNR Corporation and a local partner (IRICO), under a contract awarded in November 2010.

Network Map

See also
 Rapid transit in Iran

References

External links

 
Underground rapid transit systems in Iran
Metro
Standard gauge railways in Iran
1500 V DC railway electrification